"Walnut Grove", also known as the Andrew Beirne House, is a historic home located near Union, Monroe County, West Virginia.  It is a "T" shaped dwelling that integrates four separate structures.  The oldest date to the 1780s and incorporates two, two-story log buildings. Attached to them is a formerly detached log kitchen. A two-story, Greek Revival-style brick addition was built after 1825. The entrance is in this section and features a one-story porch supported by square columns.  Also on the property are a two-room frame office building, brick smokehouse, and stone springhouse.  It was home to U.S. Congressman Andrew Beirne (1771–1845).

It was listed on the National Register of Historic Places in 1977. It is located in the Union Historic District, listed in 1990.

References

Houses on the National Register of Historic Places in West Virginia
Greek Revival houses in West Virginia
Houses in Monroe County, West Virginia
National Register of Historic Places in Monroe County, West Virginia
Federal architecture in West Virginia
Individually listed contributing properties to historic districts on the National Register in West Virginia